Ciohorăni is a commune in Iași County, Western Moldavia, Romania. It is composed of a single village, Ciohorăni. The commune was formed in 2005, when it split away from Miroslovești.

References

Communes in Iași County
Localities in Western Moldavia